In Minister of Law and Order v Kadir, an important 1994 case in both the South African law of delict and South African criminal law, the police had failed to collect information which would have enabled the seriously injured respondent to pursue a civil claim against the driver of the other vehicle. The Minister raised an exception, contending that there was no legal duty on the police to collect such information. The court a quo dismissed this argument, finding that the community would consider otherwise. On appeal, however, it was held that society understood that police functions relate to criminal matters—they are not designed to assist civil litigants—and would baulk at the idea of holding policemen personally liable for damages arising out of a relatively insignificant dereliction. The respondent, therefore, had not proved a legal duty.

See also 
 Law of South Africa
 South African criminal law
 South African law of delict

References 
 Minister of Law & Order v Kadir] 1995 (1) SA 303 (A). Case No 246/93, Southern African Legal Information Institute

Notes 

1994 in South African law
1994 in case law
South African criminal case law
Appellate Division (South Africa) cases